HMS Incomparable was the name given by Admiral John "Jackie" Fisher to a proposal for a very large battlecruiser which was suggested in 1915. The design was intended to mount 20-inch guns, which would have been the largest ever mounted on a warship. Despite research into the concept, it never entered the design stage or came close to being built.

History 
Fisher had long been an advocate of improving technology to maintain Britain's naval superiority. At the beginning of the 20th century he had masterminded the introduction of the dreadnought type of battleship and its faster cousin, the battlecruiser. At the start of World War I, Fisher returned to the office of First Sea Lord. Here he oversaw the development of vessels which took the battlecruiser concept to its logical extreme.

Favouring an amphibious assault on the Pomeranian coast of Germany, three "large light cruisers" were built. These ships (Courageous-class battlecruisers) were designed to have a relatively shallow draft, but while they mounted large guns, they would have carried less armour than contemporary battlecruisers. One of these guns was actually fitted to Furious, the one in the aft position, but was removed after a few months following damage to the ship when it was fired.

Design 
Incomparable was suggested as the logical conclusion of this trend. By the standards of her time, she would have been a mammoth vessel. Her intended displacement of 48,000 tons dwarfed the newly built s (28,000 tons). No British battleship or battlecruiser would be built of that displacement until , which was completed after World War II.

This large hull was intended to accommodate engines capable of immense speed and sufficient fuel to give a prodigious range, coupled with armament and ammunition greater than anything before sent to sea. The 20-inch guns which were planned for Incomparable were bigger than the largest guns ever installed on a warship (the 18.1-inch guns of ): 20-inch guns were ultimately only ever to be used on paper. The 18 inch gun tested on Furious was used on monitors during the war, from which complaints were occasionally voiced that it 'caused a shower of sheared off rivet heads' whenever fired. Just as remarkable as the firepower intended was the speed of the ship: if Incomparable had been capable of the 35 knots intended, she would have been faster than almost any battleship or battlecruiser built historically, and indeed faster than many cruisers or destroyers.

She was expected to have a life span of no more than 10 years; Fisher expected her design to be quickly surpassed.

As a warship, Incomparable would have been of dubious tactical value. Her construction would have been a very great expense, and her armour relatively weak. The Royal Navy's experience at the Battle of Jutland in 1916, where three of Fisher's battlecruisers were destroyed, resulted in a decisive turn away from the 'large light cruiser' concept and towards the 'fast battleship'. Only one, was completed, with the rest scrapped in 1919. The following class intended (but also never built), based on the G3 design, was a battlecruiser only in relation to the paired N3 battleship.

Note

References

External links
 Incomparable History

Battlecruisers of the Royal Navy
World War I battlecruisers of the United Kingdom
Proposed ships of the Royal Navy
Abandoned military projects of the United Kingdom